The siege of Heidelberg or the Imperial-Spanish capture of Heildelberg took place from 23 July to 19 September 1622, at Heidelberg, Electorate of the Palatinate, between the Imperial-Spanish army led by Johan Tzerclaes, Count of Tilly and Don Gonzalo Fernández de Córdoba against the Anglo-Protestant forces of Frederick V, Elector Palatine, commanded by Sir Gerard Herbert and Sir Horace Vere during the Palatinate campaign, in the context of the Thirty Years' War.  On 16 September the city of Heidelberg was taken by storm, and the Heidelberg Castle surrendered three days later to the Imperial and Spanish forces.

Background
In 1620 the Spanish commander Don Ambrosio Spinola adopted Fabian tactics in the hope of wearing the enemy out, until the approach of winter compelled the English and their allies to seek quarters. Sir Horace Vere divided his troops among the three most important strongholds of the Palatinate. He himself occupied Mannheim, Sir Gerard Herbert he stationed in Heidelberg Castle, while Sir John Burroughs undertook to defend Frankenthal.

Early in 1621 the Protestant Union was broken up, and the English garrisons had to give up all hope of relief. The English governors were not closely pressed that year. The garrison under Sir Horace Vere at Mannheim received a visit early in 1622 from the dethroned Frederick V, Elector Palatine, who had promised them a diversion, and who, in conjunction with Ernst von Mansfeld, had inflicted a momentary check upon the Imperialist army under Johan Tzerclaes, Count of Tilly, at Wiesloch (April). A few weeks later, however, the Count of Tilly, having been reinforced by the Spanish army of Don Gonzalo Fernández de Córdoba, inflicted defeats on the Protestants, capturing a large number of German towns held by Protestants, and in June, Frederick V had finally to leave Mannheim.

Siege of Heidelberg
The combined Protestant forces, now numbering 25,000 strong, positioned themselves on the western bank of the Rhine and ceased challenging the invasion of the Palatinate.
The English garrisons were now surrounded by a force of Imperialists and Spaniards under Tilly and Córdoba. Heidelberg came under siege by the Imperial-Spanish forces. Vere resolved to hold out, though he knew that the military position was hopeless.

In July 1622 it was decided that the Protestant force under Mansfeld and Brunswick should instead march through the Netherlands to lift the siege of Bergen-op-Zoom. When the Spanish learned of the move, Córdoba was hastily recalled to intercept them. He did so in the bloody Battle of Fleurus on August 29, but the siege of Bergen still had to be aborted.

After 11 weeks of resistance, Heidelberg fell on 19 September 1622.

The English commander of the Protestant forces, Sir Gerard Herbert, was mortally wounded during the siege.

Aftermath

The progress of the Spanish was unstoppable, and after the fall of Heidelberg, and the unsuccessful Protestant defense at Mannheim, the Spanish army captured the town. Finally, the defensive Anglo-Protestant forces under Sir Horace Vere, after a futile struggle, were defeated and capitulated.

Only Frankenthal remained loyal to Frederick V, Elector Palatine, defended by the forces of Sir John Burroughs, but was taken one year later by the Spanish troops, thus leaving the Electorate of the Palatinate in the hands of the Spaniards.

See also
Electorate of the Palatinate
Battle of Stadtlohn

Notes

References
 Rudolf Schäfer: Höchst am Main. Frankfurt am Main 1981: Frankfurter Sparkasse 1822.
 Rudolf Schäfer: Chronik von Höchst am Main. Frankfurt 1986: Waldemar Kramer.
 Adalbert Vollert: Sossenheim. Geschichte eines Frankfurter Stadtteils. Frankfurt  1980: Frankfurter Sparkasse von 1822.
 Johann Philipp Abelin: Theatrum Europaeum, Vol. 1, Frankfurt 1662, plate 1622, pages 630–633.
 Victor Hugo: "Heidelberg" of Frankfurt am Main: Societäts-Verlag, 2003. 
 Harry B. Davis: "What Happened in Heidelberg: From Heidelberg Man to the Present": Verlag Brausdruck GmbH, 1977. 
 Josef V. Polišenský/Frederick Snider: War and society in Europe (1618–1648). Bristol: Cambridge University Press, 1978. 

Heidelberg
Heidelberg (1622)
Heidelberg (1622)
Heidelberg (1622)
1622 in the Spanish Empire
Heidelberg
History of Heidelberg
Electoral Palatinate
1622 in the Holy Roman Empire
Heidelberg